Yogendra Makwana (born 1933) is an Indian politician and a former union minister of India. He was a member of Rajya Sabha from 1973 to 1988 elected from Gujarat. He was also a member of the Planning Commission of India. In 2008 he founded the National Bahujan Congress, after he broke away from the Indian National Congress.

References

1933 births
Rajya Sabha members from Gujarat
Living people
Indian National Congress politicians from Gujarat